The WXW Diamond Division Championship (formerly known as the WXW C4 Women's Championship) is one of two top women's professional wrestling title in the World Xtreme Wrestling promotion. It was created in 2009. Currently, there have been six recognized known champions with a total of nine title reigns.

Names

Title history

List of top combined reigns

References

Women's professional wrestling championships
World Xtreme Wrestling championships